Elise Fichtner (1809-1889) was an Austrian stage actor. She was engaged at the Burgtheater in 1822-1864, where she belonged to the most famed elite actors of her time and performed heroine-roles, and progressively mother-roles, in romantic dramas.

References 

 Wilhelm Kosch, Deutsches Theater-Lexikon.

1809 births
1889 deaths
19th-century Austrian actresses
Austrian stage actresses